The discography of English producer Danny L Harle consists of one studio album, one remix album, two collaborative albums, two extended plays, 22 singles, and 22 remixes.

Albums

Studio albums

Collaborative albums

Remix albums

Extended plays

Singles

Remixes

Songwriting and production credits

References

Electronic music discographies
Discographies of British artists